Kay Lynaugh Ward (born 1942) is an American Moravian bishop. Ward was the first woman to be named a bishop in the Moravian Church.

Career 
Ward was trained as an educator prior to her ordination as a minister in 1979. Throughout her career she has served as pastor for numerous congregations, sometimes with her husband Aden. She has also worked as director of continuing education at the Moravian Theological Seminary. She was serving in this role when she was elected a bishop by the Northern Province of the Moravian Church in 1998.

She thus became the first woman bishop in the Moravian Unity. Ward, who received her graduate degree from the Claremont School of Theology, has written a number of books, including a Bible study.

References

1942 births
Living people
Bishops of the Moravian Church
American people of the Moravian Church
Women bishops
Moravian University faculty
American women non-fiction writers
American religious writers
Women religious writers
20th-century American women writers
20th-century American non-fiction writers
21st-century American women writers
21st-century American non-fiction writers
American women academics